Forgách utca (Forgách Street) is a station on the Budapest Metro Line 3 (North-South). It is located in Angyalföld district, beneath Váci út between its intersections with streets Fáy utca and Forgách utca. The station was opened on 14 December 1990 as part of the extension from Árpád híd.

Connections
 Bus: 32

References

M3 (Budapest Metro) stations
Railway stations opened in 1990
Forgách family